Giusy Ferreri (born Giuseppa Gaetana Ferreri on 17 April 1979) is an Italian singer and songwriter. In 2008, she took part at the first Italian edition of the talent show X Factor, coming in second place.

She topped the Italian Singles Chart 5 times, with the singles "Non ti scordar mai di me", "Novembre", diamond certified collaboration  "Roma-Bangkok" with Baby K, "Amore e Capoeira" and "Jambo", both with Tagaki and Ketra. She spent a total of 48 weeks at number one in the country, beating the previous record owned by Madonna (38 weeks).

Ferreri has sold over 2.8 million copies worldwide to-date.

She has collaborated with many notable Italian singers, including Ornella Vanoni, Claudio Baglioni, Ron, Tiziano Ferro, J-Ax, Ermal Meta and Giuliano Sangiorgi.

Career
In June 2008, Sony BMG Italy released the debut EP by Ferreri, which includes her first single "Non ti Scordar mai di me" written by Italian pop singer Tiziano Ferro, and five covers of classic songs from the 1960s and 1970s. The single held the number one position of the Italian singles chart for fifteen consecutive weeks, becoming one of the most successful tracks ever on that chart. The album debuted at the top spot of the Italian album chart and stayed there for eleven consecutive weeks. It went on to be certified 4× platinum denoting over 314,000 copies shipped.

Debut album: Gaetana

In October 2008, the song Novembre, the first single from Ferreri's official debut album Gaetana, was released. The tune debuted at number one in Italy and held the top for eight weeks so far. The album was released on 14 November 2008. It debuted at number one on the iTunes Italy chart and subsequently peaked at #2 on the Italian FIMI albums chart, behind Laura Pausini's album "Primavera anticipata", selling over 80,000 copies in its first week of release. The album sold so far over 706,000 copies in Italy and Greece and was cerified "Diamond" by FIMI for selling more than 350.000 copies in the country. The second single from the album, "Stai fermo lì", was announced on 8 January 2009 and was released in Italy on 16 January 2009. The third single off the album was "La Scala (The Ladder)", originally written by Linda Perry and translated in Italian by singer Tiziano Ferro. The song peaking at #27 on the FIMI singles chart and at #49 on the Greece Singles Chart.

Cover album: Fotografie

On 20 November 2009 her second studio album was released across Europe, debuting at #10 on the Italian FIMI albums chart. The first single is a cover of "Ma il cielo è sempre più blu" by Rino Gaetano.

In her second studio album, Ferreri records cover versions of some of her favourite (Italian and international) artists: "La magia è la mia amante (I Was Made to Love Magic)" by Nick Drake, "Con una rosa" by Vinicio Capossela and Paolo Benvegnù, "Il mare verticale (Portrait the Sea)" by Jerome Kern, "Yesterdays" (song played in the past by Billie Holiday), "Ciao amore ciao" by Luigi Tenco and Estate by Bruno Martino. In 2010 the rapper Marracash and Ferreri released the single "Rivincita" . The song was the single from the Marracash album "Fino a qui tutto bene".

Third album: Il mio universo

On 16 February 2011 her third studio album was released across Europe, debuting at #13 and peaked at #11 on the Italian FIMI albums chart and #98 on the Swiss Album chart. The first single is "Il mare immenso" released on the very same day, written by Bungaro. The first single taken from her third studio album debuted at #8 and peaked at #6 on the FIMI Top 10 Singles Chart. "Il mare immenso" stayed for three months in the top fifty of the FIMI Singles Charts and peaked at number 5 of the Italian Radio Airplay Chart. Eventually the song was awarded as the Best Sanremo Song at the "Premio Lunezia". The second and third singles, "Piccoli Dettagli" and "Noi brave ragazze", were written respectively by Rudy Marra and Bungaro. "Piccoli Dettagli" was chosen as the "Song of the summer" after a survey made by Skytv

Fourth album: L'attesa, "Roma-Bangkok" and Hits

After participating to Sanremo with  the single "Ti porto a cena con me", Giusy released the album "L'attesa" which debuted and peaked at number 4 of the Italian Charts. Her second single "La bevanda ha un retrogusto amaro", failed to enter the charts. 
In 2015 she came back with Baby K for the single "Roma-Bangkok". The song was extremely successful in many countries of Europe. It remained on top of the Italian chart for eleven consecutive weeks and later was certified "Diamond" in Italy for selling more than 500.000 copies in the country. "Roma Bangkok" was the best selling hit of 2015 and so far it is the Most Italian Video Watched on YouTube with more than 250.000.000 views. In November of the same year Giusy released her first greatest hits, Hits, which was certified "Gold" for selling more than 25.000 copies. The lead single "Volevo te" reached number 2 of the Italian Airplay charts and was certified platinum by FIMI.

Fifth album: Girotondo

In 2017 Giusy came back to Sanremo Music Festival with the song "Fa talmente male" and released the album "Girotondo" which debuted and peaked at number 11. The second single "Partiti adesso" reached number 1 on the Italian Airplay Charts and was certified platinum by FIMI. The third single "L'amore mi perseguita" featuring Tiromancino peaked at number six of the Italian Airplay charts. Giusy took part in the seventeenth edition of the talent show Amici di Maria De Filippi. She was one of the teacher/judges together with Rudy Zerbi, Paola Turci, Alessandra Celentano and Veronica Peparini.

In the summer 2018, Tagaki and Ketra chose Ferreri to be the female voice of the song "Amore e Capoeira", which spent 12 weeks at number one of the Italian Charts and reached number 2 in Switzerland. The single was certified 5 times Platinum for selling more than 250,000 copies. The song won the "Wind Summer Festival" and was awarded the "Song of the Summer 2018". The "Girotondo Live Tour" started in the beginning of May in Tuscany.

In January 2019 Giusy released "Le cose che canto": the song was written by Dario Faini and Tommaso Paradiso. In May 2019 the collaboration with Tagaki and Ketra continued and together with Omi. They released the single "Jambo" that reached number one after three weeks. The song stayed at number one for two weeks and was certified double platinum for selling more than 150,000 copies. In November 2019 she released the song "Momenti perfetti", written by Roberto Casalino and Niccolò Verrienti.

On 24 June 2020 a collaboration with the singer Elettra Lamborghini was announced and on 29 of the same month, the song "La Isla" was released. The song peaked at number 22 of the Italian Single Charts and was the 93rd best selling single of the year in Italy. "La Isla" was produced by Takagi & Ketra. In November 2020 the song has been certified Platinum by the Italian Federation of Music. 
In May 2021 Takagi & Ketra renovated for the third time the collaboration with Ms Ferreri with the single "Shimmy Shimmy" a dance pop song with an Arabic Touch. The song went viral on TikTok thanks to the video coreography. 
"Shimmy Shimmy" debuted at number 82 of the Italian Single Charts and eventually peaked at  number 22 reaching the Platinum Certification for more than 70.000 copies sold in the country. The song managed to reach the number 4 of the Italian Airplay radio.

Discography 

 2008 - Non ti scordar mai di me
 2008 - Gaetana
 2009 - Fotografie
 2011 - Il mio universo
 2014 - L'attesa
 2015 - Hits
 2017 - Girotondo
 2022 - Cortometraggi

TV programs 

 X Factor, second edition (Rai 2, 2008) contestant -second place
 Amici di Maria De Filippi, seventeenth edition (Canale 5, 2017–2018) teacher-judge

Awards and nominations

Notes

External links
 Official Site

1979 births
Italian pop singers
Living people
X Factor (Italian TV series) contestants
Sony BMG artists
Torch singers
Musicians from Palermo
21st-century Italian singers
21st-century Italian women singers